Pal Shazar is an American singer/songwriter. She was a founding member of the 1980s new wave pop group Slow Children, and married one of the band's producers, Jules Shear, in the late 1980s.

Career
Slow Children released two albums on the RCA Records label, the self titled debut in 1981 and Mad About Town in 1982. Shazar released several CDs, starting in the 1990s, on various labels.

Shazar co-wrote several songs with Matthew Sweet for his album Inside (1986), and wrote lyrics for Sara Lee for her album Make It Beautiful (2000).

Shazar is also a painter; an example of her work is featured on the cover of The Waterboys' Dream Harder album, and she has self-published a book of lyrics and art, Pal Shazar: The Illustrated Lyrics, in 2008.

Shazar was featured on the cover of photographer Linda Troeller's book The Erotic Lives of Women, which included photos that were also used for the graphics of Shazar's 1997 album Woman Under the Influence.

In May 2011, Shazar's first novel, Janitor, was self-published. It is an erotic story as told by the title character. The man's point of view is also expressed in the accompanying CD of 13 songs that illustrate every chapter. An excerpt from the book was previously published in a Penthouse feature "Women's Erotic Fiction".

In 2013, she self-published Pal Shazar's La Strada, a collection of 42 paintings, inspired by the 1954 film of the same name.

In January 2013, Shazar and her husband, singer/songwriter Jules Shear, released Shear Shazar. Their follow-up EP was released in 2014.

Discography

Slow Children albums
Slow Children - 1981
Mad About Town - 1982
CottonCloud9 - 2016

Pal Shazar CD albums
 Cowbeat of My Heart - 1991
 There's a Wild Thing in the House - 1995
 Woman Under the Influence - 1997
 Safe - 1999
 Shazar No. 5 - 2002
 The Morning After - 2006
 Psychedelicate - 2009
 Janitor - 2019
 Blondes Prefer Gentlemen - 2020

Pal Shazar CD EPs
 The Requiem Tapes - 1994
 Promo CD - 1995
 Penny for Your Thoughts - 1996

Other
 Walking and Talking Movie Soundtrack - 1996

References

External links

1952 births
Living people
American women songwriters
American women pop singers
21st-century American women